Dilaver Pasha (died 19 May 1622) was an Ottoman statesman. He was grand vizier of the Ottoman Empire from 1621 to 1622. He was born in Istanbul to Croat parents.

See also
 List of Ottoman Grand Viziers

References

17th-century Grand Viziers of the Ottoman Empire
People from the Ottoman Empire of Croatian descent
Converts to Sunni Islam from Catholicism
Croatian Muslims
Ottoman governors of Cyprus